Procambarus brazoriensis, the Brazoria crayfish, is a species of crayfish which is endemic to Brazoria County, Texas. It is listed as an endangered species on the IUCN Red List.

References

Cambaridae
Freshwater crustaceans of North America
Endemic fauna of Texas
Taxonomy articles created by Polbot
Crustaceans described in 1975